The first annual MTV Video Music Awards Latinoamérica 2002 took place on October 24, 2002, in Miami at the Jackie Gleason Theater.

Nominations
Winners in bold.

Artist of the Year
 Alejandro Sanz
 Diego Torres
 Juanes
 La Ley
 Shakira

Video of the Year
 Diego Torres — "Color Esperanza" 
 Enrique Iglesias — "Héroe" 
 Juanes — "A Dios le Pido"
 Paulina Rubio — "Si Tú Te Vas"
 Shakira — "Suerte"

Best Male Artist
 Alejandro Sanz
 Diego Torres
 Enrique Iglesias
 Gustavo Cerati
 Juanes

Best Female Artist
 Ely Guerra
 Érica García
 Paulina Rubio
 Shakira
 Thalía

Best Group or Duet
 Babasónicos
 Catupecu Machu
 Kinky
 La Ley
 La Oreja de Van Gogh

Best Pop Artist
 Alejandro Sanz
 Diego Torres
 Enrique Iglesias
 Paulina Rubio
 Shakira

Best Rock Artist
 Aterciopelados
 Babasónicos
 Catupecu Machu
 Juanes
 La Ley

Best Alternative Artist
 Celso Piña
 Ely Guerra
 Enrique Bunbury
 Kinky
 Manu Chao

Best Pop Artist — International
 Avril Lavigne
 Britney Spears
 Kylie Minogue
 Nelly Furtado
 Pink

Best Rock Artist — International
 Coldplay
 Linkin Park
 No Doubt
 Red Hot Chili Peppers
 System of a Down

Best New Artist — International
 Avril Lavigne
 Gorillaz
 Linkin Park
 Nelly Furtado
 System of a Down

Best Artist — North
 Aleks Syntek
 Juanes
 Kinky
 Paulina Rubio
 Shakira

Best New Artist — North
 Cabas
 Celso Piña
 Kinky
 Sin Bandera
 Volován

Best Artist — Southwest
 Javiera y Los Imposibles
 La Ley
 Líbido
 Los Bunkers
 Los Prisioneros

Best New Artist — Southwest
 DJ Méndez
 Los Bunkers
 Mamma Soul
 No Me Acuerdo
 Sinergia

Best Artist — Southeast
 Babasónicos
 Bersuit Vergarabat
 Catupecu Machu
 Diego Torres
 Gustavo Cerati

Best New Artist — Southeast
 Bandana
 Daniela Herrero
 Jorge Drexler
 Leo García
 Parraleños

MTV Legend Award
 Soda Stereo

Performances
 Santana and Michelle Branch — "The Game of Love"
 Molotov and Juanes — "Here Comes the Mayo" / "Mala Gente"
 Avril Lavigne — "Complicated"
 Shakira — "Inevitable"
 Maná — "Ángel de Amor"
 System of a Down — "Chop Suey!"
 Café Tacuba, Álvaro Henríquez, Javiera Parra, Ely Guerra and Érica García — "Olor a Gas"
 Diego Torres — "Color Esperanza"
 Kinky and Paulina Rubio — "Más" / "I Was Made for Lovin' You"

Appearances
The Rolling Stones — introduced the audience to the show and introduced Santana and Michelle Branch
Juanes and Diego Torres — presented Best Female Artist
Johnny Knoxville, Jason Acuña and Ryan Dunn — presented Best Rock Artist
Paulina Rubio — introduced Molotov
Anastacia, Enrique Bunbury and Dante Spinetta — presented Best New Artist—International
Álex Lora, Ricardo Mollo and Jorge González — presented Video of the Year
Nick Carter (from the Backstreet Boys) and Fey — introduced Avril Lavigne
Yamila Díaz-Rahi, Liliana Domínguez and Roselyn Sánchez — presented Best Rock Artist—International
Julio Iglesias Jr. and Bandana — introduced Shakira
Natalia Oreiro and Ruth Infarinato — presented Best Artist—Southeast
Avril Lavigne, Aleks Syntek and Facundo Gómez — presented Best Group or Duet
Carlos Santana — introduced Maná
Jaime Bayly, Angie Cepeda and Sofía Vergara — presented Best Artist—Southwest
Adrián Dárgelos (from Babasónicos) and Cabas — presented Best Pop Artist—International
Iggy Pop and Dolores Barreiro — introduced System of a Down
Mario Pergolini — presented MTV Legend Award
Andrea Echeverri and Héctor Buitrago (from Aterciopelados) — introduced Café Tacuba, Álvaro Henríquez, Javiera Parra, Ely Guerra and Érica García
Javiera Parra (from Javiera y Los Imposibles) and Ely Guerra — introduced Diego Torres
Howie Dorough (from the Backstreet Boys), Yolanda Andrade and Montserrat Olivier — presented Best Male Artist
Maná — presented Artist of the Year

References

Latin American music
MTV Video Music Awards
2002 music awards